Forever Love is a 2015 Chinese romantic drama film directed by An Zhanjun. It was released on December 11, 2015.

Plot

Cast
Joe Chen
Li Baotian
Ma Yuan
Sun Yizhou
Chrissie Chau

Reception
The film has grossed  in China.

References

2015 romantic drama films
Chinese romantic drama films